Caroline Elizabeth Rose (born October 19, 1989) is an American singer, songwriter, musician and producer. After releasing two records of folk and country-inspired music, she released a pop-rock album Loner in 2018. Her most recent album, Superstar, was released on March 6, 2020.

Early life
Born in 1989 in Long Island, Rose grew up in Center Moriches, New York. The daughter of two artists, Rose began writing songs and poems at age 13. Rose attended Wellesley College in Massachusetts, where she graduated in 2011 with a bachelor's degree in architecture.

Career 
In 2012, Rose and producer/multi-instrumentalist Jer Coons launched a Kickstarter to fund the production of Rose's first album America Religious. The album, blending American folk music, country, and rockabilly styles was self-published later that year. Two years later, Rose released her first nationally distributed album, I Will Not Be Afraid on Little Hi! Records. Like the first album, it was produced with Jer Coons and featured music in a variety of Americana musical styles, including two songs previously released on America Religious.

Following the release of I Will Not Be Afraid, Rose took an extended hiatus from touring and releasing new material, while she explored new musical directions that would broaden her sound. After three years, numerous personnel changes, a signing to Mom + Pop Music, and a switch to New West Records, Rose released her third album. The new album, Loner, was co-produced by Rose and Paul Butler of The Bees, and represented a radical shift away from the musical style of her previous work, blending pop and alternative rock elements, and incorporating prominent synthesizers throughout. Notably, this album also saw a change in lyrical tone, incorporating a number of overtly humorous, sarcastic, and satirical songs. Although Rose played most of the instruments on the album, she formed a new band to perform on tour.

Prior to Loner's release, Rose released "Money" and "Soul No. 5" with accompanying music videos. Rose released a music video for "Jeannie Becomes a Mom" on October 17, 2020. The video, which was directed by Amanda Speva, features Abby Pierce as the titular character, depicting Jeannie moving into a new home, performing a dance routine with the movers, and preparing a rainbow Jell-O cake. The song was ranked the fifteenth-best single of the year by National Public Radio.

On January 7, 2020, Rose announced a new album called Superstar, releasing a single and a music video for the song "Feel The Way I Want". The video was shot on an iPhone over the course of an 11-day roadtrip from Hollywood, California to Hollywood, Florida, documenting the protagonist's journey after they travel to the wrong Hollywood for an audition. According to Rose, the album is a "cinematic pop album that tells a story of someone who leaves behind everything they know and love in search for something bigger and more glamorous. It's a story about losing yourself but also finding the brazen self-confidence to follow a dream."  The album Superstar was released on March 6, 2020, and Caroline Rose made her television debut on February 24, 2020 performing "Feel The Way I Want" on Late Night with Seth Meyers.

Personal life 
Rose uses they/them, she/her, and it/its pronouns and identifies as queer. She lives in Austin, Texas.

Discography

Studio albums
America Religious (2012)
I Will Not Be Afraid (2014)
Loner (2018)
Superstar (2020)
The Art of Forgetting (2023)

Singles

Other appearances

References

External links

 

Living people
1989 births
Folk musicians from New York (state)
American indie pop musicians
American indie rock musicians
Musicians from Burlington, Vermont
Wellesley College alumni
Singers from New York (state)
Songwriters from New York (state)
People from Center Moriches, New York
21st-century American women singers
American LGBT singers
American LGBT songwriters
Queer women
Queer singers
Queer songwriters
21st-century LGBT people